Events in the year 1993 in Namibia.

Incumbents 

 President: Sam Nujoma
 Prime Minister: Hage Geingob
 Chief Justice of Namibia: Ismael Mahomed

Events 
 23 February – The National Council of the country was founded.
 September – The first Namibian dollar notes were issued.

Deaths

References 

 
1990s in Namibia
Years of the 20th century in Namibia
Namibia
Namibia